Walter Butler Shipbuilders Inc. was a large-scale World War II ship manufacturing shipyard, located at Superior, Wisconsin. Walter Butler purchased the shipyard from  Lake Superior Shipbuilding in 1942. Walter Butler Shipbuilders Inc. was at E 1st St, Superior, Wisconsin. The shipyard was located on the western part of Lake Superior. Walter Butler Shipbuilders Inc. was found by Walter Butler in 1942 to built ships for World War II. Walter Butler Shipbuilders Inc., the McDougall Duluth Shipbuilding Company and the Superior Shipbuilding Company (now Fraser Shipyards) were called the Twin Ports shipbuilding industry of Minnesota and Wisconsin. Once built the ships can travel to the Atlantic Ocean through the Great Lakes and the Saint Lawrence Seaway.

To expand operations and built more ships the Emergency Shipbuilding Program, Walter Butler purchased the Barnes-Duluth Shipbuilding at 110 Spring Street, Duluth, Minnesota, now the site of the West Duluth's Spirit Lake Marina. The Duluth shipyard was located on St. Louis River Estuary 6 miles west of the Superior shipyard. The shipyard was called Walter Butler Shipbuilders-Duluth.  At the Duluth shipyards built were C1-M type ships. The Superior and Duluth shipyards closed in August 1945, as all war contacts ended and there was a surplus of ships at the end of the war.  In 1950 the Superior shipyard site became the Enbridge Ogdensburg Pier that serves the inland Enbridge's Superior Terminal.

Butler Brothers
Walter Butler shipbuilding was a family company started in 1877 as the Butler Brothers Shipbuilders, then later called Walter Butler Shipbuilders Inc. The brother pass the yard to Robert Butler (1897-1955). After the war Robert Butler was appointed US Ambassador to Australia by President Truman in 1946.
The Butler Brothers started as an iron ore mining company in Cooley and Nashwauk, Minnesota in the 1920s and 1930s. Butler Brothers sold the company to the Hanna Mining Company. The Butler Brothers were: Walter (1858-1933), Pierce (1866–1939), Emmett (1870-1870), Cooley (1868-1965), John (1876-1926), Willian (1864-1916).  They start as the group that ran the Butler Brothers Construction Company. Pierce Butler was the legal counsel for the Butler Brothers construction company.Butler Brothers Construction The Butler Brothers father was Patrick Butler (1824 - 1900) born in Dublin, Ireland and came to America when he was 20. Patrick  married Mary Ann Gaffney on February 11, 1850, in Galena, Illinois. They came to Minnesota in 1856.

Walter Butler was born in Lakeville, Minnesota on July 6, 1858. Walter went to Carleton College in Northfield, Minnesota. In 1880 he became a bricklayer and moved to Saint Paul, Minnesota. His brothers also moved to Saint Paul and stated Butler Brothers Construction partnership in 1887. Butler Brothers Construction first large contract was building Macalester College in Saint Paul. Next large contract was in 1904 to build Grand Central Terminal in New York City. Other projects included working on the House wing of the North Dakota State Capitol (1903) and Detroit River Tunnel (1906-1910). In 1884 Walter Butler married Rose Sweeny, they had five children, Rose died in 1901, Walter remarried in October 1902 to Helen Wood. Walter Butler died on October 28, 1933, at the age of 75.

Walter Butler Superior shipyard
Walter Butler Shipbuilders Inc. Superior shipyard built ships under the Emergency Shipbuilding Program:

N3-S-A1: Type N3 ship, 2,905 DWT cargo ship, length: 258 feet (78.87 m), most sent to Britain, built in 1943: 

	John W. Arey	Hull #	1	Ship ID	169573  (sank 1971)
	Rodney Baxter	Hull #	2	Ship ID	169619  (sank 1972 and again in 1974 )
	Richard Bearse	Hull #	3	Ship ID	169608
	William Brewster	Hull #	4	Ship ID	169922
	William Bursley	Hull #	5	Ship ID	169577  (mined 1945, collision 1954, wrecked 1964)
	Ashman J. Clough	Hull #	6	Ship ID	169602  (torpedoed sank 1944)
	Calvin Coggin	Hull #	7	Ship ID	169600
	Jesse G. Cotting	Hull #	8	Ship ID	169613
	Josiah P. Cressey	Hull #	9	Ship ID	169596  (sank 1949)
	Tully Crosby	Hull #	10	Ship ID	169601  (sank 1965)
	Elkanah Crowell	Hull #	11	Ship ID	169612
	Justin Doane	Hull #	12	Ship ID	169618 (sank 1950)
	Asa Eldridge	Hull #	13	Ship ID	169711
	Anthony Enright	Hull #	14	Ship ID	169607
	Watson Ferris	Hull #	15	Ship ID	169713
	Bailey Foster	Hull #	16	Ship ID	169675
	Gurden Gates	Hull #	17	Ship ID	169665 (burnt abandoned 1967)

 
S2-S2-AQ1 Tacoma-class frigate, length 303 feet, built in 1944:

	Moses Gay	Hull #	18	Ship ID	169727
		Hull #	19	Ship ID	PF 22
	 Hull #	20	Ship ID	PF 23
	 Hull #	21	Ship ID	PF 24
	 Hull #	22	Ship ID	PF 25
	 Hull #	23	Ship ID	PF 26
	 Hull #	24	Ship ID	PF 27
		Hull #	25	Ship ID	PF 28
		Hull #	26	Ship ID	PF 29
		Hull #	27	Ship ID	PF 30
		Hull #	28	Ship ID	PF 31
	 Hull #	29	Ship ID	PF 32
	 Hull #	30	Ship ID	PF 33

C1-M-AV1  Cargo ship type C1, length 338 feet, 5,032 DWT, with one large diesel engine, built in 1944 and 1945:

		Hull #	31	Ship ID	AK 182
	 Hull #	32	Ship ID	AK 183
	 Hull #	33	Ship ID	AK 184
		Hull #	34	Ship ID	AK 185
	 Hull #	35	Ship ID	AK 186
	 Hull #	36	Ship ID	AK 187
		Hull #	37	Ship ID	AK 188
	 Hull #	38	Ship ID	AK 189
	 Hull #	39	Ship ID	AK 190
	Coastal Archer	Hull #	40	Ship ID	248952
	Coastal Expounder	Hull #	41	Ship ID	248954
	Coastal Ringleader /  	Hull #	42	Ship ID	248957
	Coastal Spartan	Hull #	43	Ship ID	248959
	Coastal Harbinger	Hull #	44	Ship ID	248955
	Coastal Herald	Hull #	45	Ship ID	248683
	Phoebe Knot	Hull #	46	Ship ID	248059
	Chain and Crown	Hull #	47	Ship ID	248117
	Cinch Knot	Hull #	48	Ship ID	247893
	Hawser Eye	Hull #	49	Ship ID	248168
	Dragon Fly	Hull #	50	Ship ID	248356
	Sampan Hitch	Hull #	51	Ship ID	248570
	Jacob's Ladder	Hull #	52	Ship ID	248566

Lake Superior Shipbuilding
Lake Superior Shipbuilding built two ships before being purchased by Walter Butler Shipbuilders Inc.
The two ship were 
SS Bullwheel (YO 46)a US Navy	Oiler Hull # 101, 1,731 tons, delivered on October 21, 1942, sold to Philippine company in 1964.<ref>[http://www.navsource.org/archives/14/12046.htm navsource.org Bullwheel (YO 46)]</ref>
SS Casinghead'' (YO 47) a US Navy Oiler Hull # 102, 1,731 tons, delivered on November 12, 1942, Struck 1997US Navy, SS Casinghead (YO 47)

Globe Shipbuilding

During World War II Walter Butler Shipbuilders took over the Globe Shipbuilding shipyard in Superior, Wisconsin, near the current Fraser Shipyards, to built ships under the Emergency Shipbuilding Program. Globe Shipbuilding Company built ships for World War 1, but in a different shipyard. During World War II Globe employed 2,500 workers, 10% were female, their president was Clarence Skamser. The Globe had a baseball team that played other shipyards, including Marine Ironworks & Shipbuilding and Zenith Dredge.shipbuildinghistory.com, Globe Shipbuilding WW2Female employees of Globe Shipbuilding Company in kerchiefs and coveralls, Superior, Wisconsin, ca. 1942.shipbuildinghistory.com  Marine Iron & Shipbuilding, Duluth MN 

Ships built at Walter Butler Shipbuilders' Globe Shipbuilding shipyard:V4-M-A1 Type V ship seaworthy tugs, 186-foot long with a steel hull:

Point Sur
Farallon
Point Cabrillo
Trinidad Head
Scotch Cap
Watch Hill
Wood Island
Sands Point
Point Judith
Black RockS2-S2-AQ1 Tacoma-class frigate:

 / Worcester
 / ScrantonC1-M-AV1 Type C1 cargo ship:

 
 

 (wrecked 1970)Globe Shipbuilding World War 1'''

Globe Shipbuilding built: cargo, Naval trawler and fishing trawler ships from 1918 to 1920:

Lake Washburn, Lake Borgne, Lake Medford, Lake Arline, Sea Gull, (Trawler: Petrel, Ripple, Ocean), Conotton, Contoocook, Coolspring, Copalgrove, Lake Glebe, Lake Glencoe, Lake Fiscus, Lake Fisher, Lake Fitch, Lake Fithian, Lake Flag, Lake Glaucus, Lake Gunni, Lake Harminia, Lake Hector, and Lake Justice.

Walter Butler Duluth shipyard
Some of Walter Butler Shipbuilders Duluth ships:
Duluth shipyard built C1-M-AV1 type C1 cargo ships, 2239 tons, 3,805 DWT:

  (Hull # 328, August 1944)
 
  (wrecked 1946)

Kenneth E. Gruennert  (wrecked 1953)
 
Joe P. Martinez
 
Alexander R. Nininger, Jr.
Roband Hitch
 

 

 

 (Hull # 345, August 1945, last Walter Butler Duluth ship)

Enbridge Ogdensburg Pier
Enbridge Ogdensburg Pier was opened in 1950 at the site of the former Walter Butler Superior shipyard. The Enbridge Ogdensburg Pier serves the inland Enbridge's Superior Terminal. Enbridge is a Canadian energy transportation company with headquarters in Calgary, Alberta. Enbridge transports, distributes and generates energy, in Canada and the United States. Enbridge operates in transportation, distribution and generation of crude oil and liquid hydrocarbons-natural gas. Enbridge Ogdensburg Pier as a dock for the energy transport ships.  The Superior Terminal is 550-acre and is used to store and distributes crude oil to the United States. I also is connected to the Enbridge Pipeline System. About 20% United States crude oil imports come through the Terminal.

See also
Great Lakes Engineering Works
Collingwood Shipbuilding Company
Defoe Shipbuilding Company
Manitowoc Shipbuilding Company
American Ship Building Company
 Attack on Pearl Harbor

References

Superior, Wisconsin
Great Lakes
Lake Superior
Defunct shipbuilding companies of the United States